Sheikh Ahmad Al-Ajmi (Arabic: الشيخ أحمد بن علي بن محمد آل سليمان العجمي) is a Saudi Quran reciter and imam.

Life
Ahmad Al-Ajmi attended elementary school in the Al-Mohammadiya School in southern Khobar, went to middle school in Al-Zubair bin Al-Awwam Middle School, went to high school in Khobar Highschool in Khobar (specifically Madinat Al-Umal مدينة العمال) and after finishing high school, he went to Imam Muhammad ibn Saud Islamic University  and graduated with a bachelor's degree in sharia.

He married a woman from the Al-Badran family and has six children.

Ethnicity
Sheikh Al-Ajmi is Arab and not Ajami. His surname indicates that he belongs that to the Al Sulaiman branch of the Arab Ajman tribe.

References

 Sheikh Al-Ajmi's biography as written in his website

External links
 Sheikh Al-Ajmi reciting the whole Qur'an
 Quran in the voice of Ahmed El Agamy

Qahtanites
Living people
Saudi Arabian Quran reciters
1968 births